Rosignol United is a Guyanese football club based in Berbice that competes in the GFF National Super League, the top tier of Guyanese football. In the 2010–11, the club finished in fourth place.

References 

Football clubs in Guyana